The Premier Volleyball League 1st Season Collegiate Conference was the 3rd conference of the Premier Volleyball League (30th conference of the former Shakey's V-League). The conference started on September 2, 2017 at the Filoil Flying V Centre, San Juan.

Women's division

Participating teams

Group A

Group B

Preliminary round
Group A

Match results
 All times are in Philippines Standard Time (UTC+08:00)

Group B

Match results
 All times are in Philippines Standard Time (UTC+08:00)

Final round

 All series are best-of-3

Semifinals
Rank 1A vs Rank 2B

Rank 1B vs Rank 2A

Finals
3rd place

Championship

Awards
Most Valuable Player (Finals)

Most Valuable Player (Conference)

Best  Outside Spikers

Best Setter

Best Opposite Spiker

Best Middle Blockers

Best Libero

Final standings

Men's division

Participating teams

Line-up

Preliminary round

Match results
 All times are in Philippines Standard Time (UTC+08:00)

Final round

 All series are best-of-3

Semifinals
Rank 1 vs Rank 4

Rank 2 vs Rank 3

Finals
3rd place

Championship

Awards
Most Valuable Player (Finals)

Most Valuable Player (Conference)

Best  Outside Spikers

Best Setter

Best Opposite Spiker

Best Middle Blockers

Best Libero

Final standings

PVL on Tour
The Premier Volleyball League’s “PVL on Tour” staged by Sports Vision and Grid Athletic Sports, organizer of the immensely successful Beach Volleyball Republic, the October tour of the PVL marks the first time ever in its storied history that Sports Vision is bringing its games to the countryside. Matches were held in the People’s Gym in Tuguegarao City, Batangas City Sports Complex, Iloilo Sports Complex and La Salle Coliseum in Bacolod.

Match results
 All times are in Philippines Standard Time (UTC+08:00)

References

2017 in Philippine sport
Premier Volleyball League (Philippines) 2017 Season